Mohd Fareed Shah Hassan (born 18 August 1979) is a Malaysian professional footballer.

He began his professional career with Selangor in Sukan Malaysia 1998 which saw Selangor won the gold medal. After one season playing for Selangor, he decided to sign with Sabah. He join Penang in 2001 and won the 2001 Malaysia Premier One League.

He made a return to Selangor and help the team to beat his former team Sabah in 2002 Malaysia Cup final. In 2004, he move clubside Selangor Public Bank but move to PKNS FC after Public Bank withdrawal from the league in 2005/06 season. After 2006/07 ended, he sign with Proton FC.

References

Malaysian footballers
Living people
1979 births
PKNS F.C. players
Sabah F.C. (Malaysia) players
People from Selangor
Malaysian people of Malay descent
Association football forwards